Jordan Kerner is an American film producer.

Career 
Kerner started his career at CBS-TV KPIX-SF in San Francisco in 1971. In 1976, he became an attorney at the law firm of Ball, Hunt, Hart and Baerwitz. In 1977, he left to join CBS Entertainment as a program and talent negotiator. In 1978, he then switched to Universal Television for NBC, taking the position of assistant to the senior VP.

Two years later, he also took on the task of director of program development QM Productions. The following year, he changed jobs and became the director of dramatic series development at ABC Entertainment. He was promoted to vice president of dramatic development in 1983.

He held this position until 1986, when he formed The Avnet/Kerner Co., an independent production company, with Jon Avnet. A year later, his first feature was produced, called Less than Zero.

After another year, he had produced his first television movie, Side by Side. His acting debut was in Less than Zero (uncredited) and then George of the Jungle 2 (credited), in which he played an advertising executive in the first and an airline passenger in the second.

In 2001, he and Avnet started separate companies with Kerner forming The Kerner Entertainment Company (which is mostly known as simply The K Entertainment Company).

His mother was Jeannette Kerner, a stage and screen actress, who died in 2001, at the age of 85. He is married to Nicola O'Shea, and their daughters are Haley Lelean O'Shea Kerner, Grace Ellis O'Shea Kerner, and Lily Jeannette O'Shea Kerner.

In 2007, Kerner was appointed Dean of the School of Filmmaking at the prestigious University of North Carolina School of the Arts. In 2007, the company struck a deal with Walden Media.

Filmography
He was a producer in all films unless otherwise noted.

Film

As an actor

Thanks

Television

References

External links
 
 Kerner appointed new Dean at NCSA
 Jordan Kerner
 

American male film actors
Film producers from California
People from Los Angeles
University of Southern California alumni
Stanford University alumni
Haas School of Business alumni
University of California, Hastings College of the Law alumni
Living people
1950 births
Sony Pictures Animation people